P. A. Starck Piano was a piano company headquartered in Chicago, Illinois, United States. It was founded in 1891 and closed in 1965. It was said that its "bent acoustic rim ... [gave] the Starck upright the tone of a grand piano and [made] it especially well adapted for concert use".

References

Piano manufacturing companies of the United States
Musical instrument manufacturing companies based in Chicago
Defunct companies based in Chicago